Maunder is a lunar impact crater that is located on the far side of the Moon, just beyond the western limb. This region is sometimes brought into view during favorable librations, but not much detail can be seen. The crater lies at the northern end of the Mare Orientale, within the ring of mountains named Montes Rook, and it is the largest crater on this lunar mare. To the southeast is the crater Kopff, and due south is the small Hohmann.

The rim of Maunder is roughly circular, with a sharp edge that has not been significantly eroded. The inner walls are somewhat terraced, and slump down to a rough but level interior floor. At the midpoint of the crater is a double central peak, with the northeastern peak being the larger of the two. Surrounding the crater is a rough outer rampart that mixes with the rugged terrain along the northern half of the rim. Secondary impacts are visible in the surface to the south.

Name origin
The crater was named after Annie Maunder, a Northern Irish astronomer who worked alongside her husband, Edward Walter Maunder, at the end of the 19th century. Edward Maunder identified the period of colder climate from 1645 to 1715 that is now known as the Maunder Minimum.

Satellite craters
By convention, these features are identified on lunar maps by placing the letter on the side of the crater midpoint that is closest to Maunder.

The following craters have been renamed by the IAU.
 Maunder Z — See Couder (crater).

References

 
 
 
 
 
 
 
 
 
 
 
 

Impact craters on the Moon